Veronica Bonilla  is a children's writer, illustrator, and graphic designer from Ecuador. She was born on 11 June 1962 in Quito D.M. and has published children's literature since 2012. She has 71 international book registers ISBN in several formats, in paper as well as in digital format. She publishes in both Spanish and English, and she also has produced audiobooks.

Career 

With her experience as an educator, mother of three daughters, and ISO 9001 consultant, she debuted as writer of children's literature in 2012. With 14 titles, surpassing the production of 43 university editorial houses, she set a national record for a single author in Ecuador.

From 2012 to 2013 with Vebodi Editorial, she has published 37 books in coated paper, all of her books series are completely illustrated.

In a book series about Platanario, a children's character that is an extraterrestrial kid that fall in love with our planet, she applies her experience as ISO 9001 consultant and introduces concepts to kids such as teamwork, planning, corrective actions, preventive actions. This series is also multi-cultural, inclusive, and shows the culture of Ecuador.

As a graphic designer, she is the creator of the character Lecturin, whom she uses to promote reading. At the official site, it is possible to download a free digital magazine for kids.

She has created eleven characters that live in her publications: Platanario, Pepeko, Juanuka, Pichusa, Pedroko, Hadani, Mar-Tin, Vagotón, Tontón, Lecturin. 
Since 2012, she performs lectures to stimulate reading and workshops about imagination and creativity for librarians, teachers, fathers and mothers, also children.

She has been an educator and bilingual teacher in private institutions, and as education consultant is coauthor of a Guide of good practices for school teachers, published by Ministry of Education of Ecuador.

In 2014, she published big books in size DIN A3 in coated paper, the BIG BOOK collection. In her international stage, she devoted her time to publish e-books in both Spanish and English, also iBooks for Apple.

Works

The first book published by Veronica Bonilla is titled Gali tiene un balón, illustrated by Darwin Parra a well known artist of Cuenca city.

Veronica Bonilla has published 71 books, all completely illustrated: 14 in Spanish and in paper in year 2012; 23 books in paper in 2013, from those 15 in English; and in 2014 a total of 34 E-books in several formats, and for several series. Finally, by the end of 2014, her most recent book in paper.

Her most recent book came printed from Editorial Casa de la Cultura Ecuatoriana Benjamín Carrión, titled in Spanish La Rana Juliana , in coated paper, completely illustrated, in December 2014. This book has been published as E-book in English for iPad as July the Frog with  published by Vebodi.

This book is an adventure about an Andean marsupial frog; it carries an ecological message for kids to avoid the endangerment of this species, because its habitat is in danger by humans.

She has also produced three audiobooks in Spanish, developing own music to incorporate in her digital books.

Printed books in Spanish
 Achiiis  
 Chispitas de Alegría  
 El Genio de los deseos  
 Hadani cuida el bosque  
 Juguemos en Ecuador  
 La tortuga Tomasita   
 Mar-Tin en Galápagos  
 Un sueño mágico 
 A Ganar  
 Colección de Rimas  
 El Barquito de Balsa  
 El ratoncito r54  
 El reino de las travesuras   
 El Secreto del Rey   
 El templo de las tortugas   
 El viajero Platanario  
 Gali tiene un balón  
 Hadani la aprendiz de bruja  
 Jugando con plastilina  
 Los días sin tiempo   
 Mar -Tin y las frutas encantadas 
 Ruedas 
 Colección de Rimas  
 El ratoncito r54  
 La tortuga Tomasita / The Turtle Tomasita  (Bilingual) 
 Un sueño mágico  
 La rana Juliana  
 Mágico Yasuní

Printed books in English

 Alegria's Sparkles of Happiness   
 Let's Win   
 Mar-Tin and the Enchanted Fruits   
 Platanario the Traveler   
 Play with Clay  
 r54 The Little Mouse  
 The Balsa Wood Boat  
 The Kingdom of Mischief   
 A Magic Dream   
 The Secret of the King   
 The Turtle Tomasita  
 Timeless Days  
 The Tortoise's Temple  
 Gali has a Ball	 
 Wheels

Illustrators 
 Darwin Parra
 Gabby Hidalgo
 César Gavilánez
 Elizabeth Izquierdo
 Claudia Maggiorini
 Flor Margarita Cuichán
 Eiko Takashima
 Verónica Bonilla

References

External links 

 Official website of Veronica Bonilla

1962 births
Living people
Ecuadorian children's writers
Ecuadorian women writers
Ecuadorian women children's writers
21st-century Ecuadorian women writers